Alina Gozalova (born 16 February 2006) is an Azerbaijani rhythmic gymnast. She represent her country in international competitions.

Career 
Gonzalova debuted at the 2019 Happy Cup in Gent where she won gold with ball. A year later she was selected to participate in the 2020 European Championships in Kyiv along Narmin Bayramova, Leyli Aghazada, Ilona Zeynalova and the senior group, achieving the bronze medal in the team category.

In 2022 she debuted as a senior, taking part in two World Cup stages: Tashkent (20th in the All-Around, hoop and ribbon, 19th with ball and 15th with clubs) and Pesaro (30th in the All-Around, 35th hoop, 28th with ball, 35th with clubs and 28th with ribbon). In May she took part in the Gdynia Cup tournament where she won a bronze medal with ball. Alina was also part of the Azeri team that won gold at the V Islamic Solidarity Games in Konya. At nationals she won gold with clubs. In September Gozalova was selected for the World Championships in Sofia, she competed with hoop and ball achieving the 39th and 51st places.

Routine music information

References 

2006 births
Living people
Azerbaijani rhythmic gymnasts
Medalists at the Rhythmic Gymnastics European Championships
21st-century Azerbaijani women